Jeevan Nedunchezhiyan (born 20 October 1988) is an Indian professional tennis player. He has a career-high ranking of No. 64 achieved on 18 March 2019.  He won the doubles title with Rohan Bopanna at the 2017 Chennai Open, in a historic final featuring four Indian players. He broke into the top 100 of the ATP rankings in doubles in 2017.

Personal life
He is the grandson of veteran political leader V. R. Nedunchezhiyan, who was acting chief minister  of Tamil Nadu in two tenures. Maternally he is the grandson of Col.Dr. M. D. K. Kuthalingam, who was a former vice chancellor of Madurai Kamaraj University, and has also been Jeevan's mentor.

Professional career

2011: Turned pro
Nedunchezhiyan turned pro in year 2011.

2017: First ATP doubles title
Nedunchezhiyan won his first ATP World Tour level title at the 2017 Aircel Chennai Open. He won the title with partner Rohan Bopanna by defeating a pair of compatriots, Purav Raja and Divij Sharan, in an all Indian final. As a result he was ranked world No. 86 on 9 January 2017.

2023: Third ATP final
He reached his third ATP final at the 2023 Tata Open Maharashtra with compatriot N.Sriram Balaji as an alternate pair. They defeated compatriots Purav Raja and Divij Sharan in straight  sets in first round. In the quaterfinals, they upset second seeds Nathaniel Lammons and Jackson Withrow in straight sets winning both sets in a tiebreak. Next they defeated British pair of Jack Cash and Henry Patten in the semifinals in straight sets to reach their first ATP Tour final as a team. Despite not losing a single set on their way to final they were defeated in straight sets by Sander Gillé and Joran Vliegen in the final.

ATP career finals

Doubles: 3 (1 title, 2 runner-ups)

Challenger and Futures Finals

Singles: 14 (7–7)

Doubles: 52 (31–21)

References

External links

 
 

1988 births
Tamil sportspeople
Living people
Indian male tennis players
Racket sportspeople from Chennai
Washington Huskies men's tennis players
South Asian Games silver medalists for India
South Asian Games medalists in tennis